"Secret Garden" is a single released by Gackt on November 16, 2000 under Nippon Crown. It peaked at tenth place on the Oricon weekly chart and charted for five weeks.

Track listing

References

2000 singles
Gackt songs
2000 songs
Songs written by Gackt